Mugenthirran a/l Ganesan (born 4 April 1993) is a Malaysian footballer who plays for PKNP as a forward.

References

External links
 

1993 births
Living people
Malaysian footballers
Malaysia Super League players
PKNP FC players
Malaysian people of Tamil descent
Malaysian sportspeople of Indian descent
Association football forwards